Kevin Sparks (born 1963/1964), is an American Republican businessman who is the State Senator for the 31st District, having been duly elected in 2022. The Texas Panhandle and Permian Basin seat, where incumbent Republican Kel Seliger announced his retirement, was effectively won by Sparks after the Republican primary election as he faced no Democratic opponent in the general election.

Early life and education
Sparks was raised in Midland, Texas, and graduated from the University of Texas at Austin with a business degree. He received the Eagle Scout rank from the Boy Scouts of America in 1978.

Career

Oil
Sparks is president of Discovery Operating, Inc, a family-owned and operated oil and gas company in Midland. He has previously served as a board member of the Natural Gas Producers Association and the Texas Public Policy Foundation.

Politics
Sparks announced a primary campaign against incumbent Republican Kel Seliger, regarded as a more moderate member of the Republican caucus, in 2022. He was endorsed by former President Donald Trump, United States Senator Ted Cruz, as well as Texas Lieutenant Governor Dan Patrick and quickly became the seat's frontrunner after Seliger announced his retirement. He won the Republican primary in March with over 50% of the vote, avoiding a runoff, and faces no Democratic opponent in the general election in November.

Election history

2022

References

External links

21st-century American politicians
American businesspeople in the oil industry
Businesspeople from Texas
Date of birth missing (living people)
Living people
People from Midland, Texas
Texas Republicans
University of Texas at Austin alumni
Year of birth missing (living people)